British Regional Airlines was a franchise partner of British Airways based in Manchester. They operated a large network of domestic and European services from many UK regional airports.

British Regional Airlines held a United Kingdom Civil Aviation Authority Type A Operating Licence, It was permitted to carry passengers, cargo and mail on aircraft with 20 or more seats.

History
British Regional Airlines can trace its history back to March 1991 when Manx Airlines created Manx Airlines Europe in order to expand and fly routes within the United Kingdom.

In 1994 Manx Airlines Europe became a franchise carrier for British Airways. In September 1996 Manx Airlines Europe changed its name to British Regional Airlines.

In March 2001 British Airways purchased the British Regional Airlines Group (holding company of British Regional Airlines and Manx Airlines) for £78m. The airline was merged with Brymon Airways to create British Airways CitiExpress.

Fleet
British Regional Airlines operated a large fleet of regional aircraft including:
 22 Embraer 145
 14 BAe ATP
 12 BAe Jetstream 41
 4 BAe 146
 4 ATR 72

Gallery

See also
 List of defunct airlines of the United Kingdom

References

Defunct airlines of the United Kingdom
Airlines established in 1996
Airlines disestablished in 2002
British Airways
Defunct regional airline brands